Prespa National Park may refer to:

Prespa National Park (Albania), in southeastern Albania
Prespa National Park (Greece), in northwestern Greece

See also
Galičica National Park, adjacent national park in North Macedonia